Parkmont School is a private school, located at 4842 16th St NW in Washington, DC., that serves grades 6-12. Parkmont was founded in 1972, by a parent group in McLean, Virginia, as a cooperative middle school. Parkmont was designed for parents looking for alternative education for their child. The school uses more of a hands-on, individual, and dynamic approach than more traditional schools. Parkmont is non-sectarian and an Association of Independent Maryland and DC Schools accredited school.

History 
Parkmont was founded in 1972, as a cooperative parent-run middle school and became a board-operated 501(c)(3) in 1995. The school derived its name from the Parkway Program (Park) and the philosophy of Montessori education (mont).

Until 1977, Parkmont School was located at 16670 Chain Bridge Road in McLean, Virginia. With the help of a $100,000 grant, the school was able to relocate to Washington, D.C., to take better advantage of the educational opportunities available in the city. 

In the spring of 1991, Parkmont School merged with Somerset School and moved to its current home.

Parkmont teaching method 
Parkmont School's approach of education uses Montessori Philosophy, founded by the progressive educator, Maria Montessori (1870-1952). The Montessori philosophy is based on "supporting the complete development of the child as they progress from birth to adulthood. It takes the broad vision of education as an aid for life."

One of Montessori's many accomplishments was the Montessori method. This is a method of education for young children that stresses the development of a child's initiative and natural abilities, especially through practical play. This method allowed children to develop at their own pace.

Administration 
, the head of school is Ron McClain since 1981.

References

External links
 

Educational institutions established in 1972
Montessori schools in the United States
Private high schools in Washington, D.C.
Private middle schools in Washington, D.C.